Faria is a Portuguese and an Italian surname. Notable people with the name include:

Surname
Abbé Faria (1756–1819), a Goan Catholic monk, pioneer of the scientific study of hypnotism
Aloysio de Andrade Faria, Brazilian billionaire
Bernardo Faria, Brazilian martial artist
Betty Faria, Brazilian actress
Cândido de Faria (1849–1911), Brazilian caricaturist, painter, lithographer and poster designer
Catia Faria (born 1980), Portuguese moral philosopher and animal rights activist
Chico Faria, Portuguese footballer
 Fábio Faria (footballer) (born 1989), Portuguese footballer
 Fábio Faria (politician) (born 1977), Brazilian politician
Hugo Faria, Portuguese footballer
Inês Faria, Portuguese actress
Jacob Faria, professional baseball player for the Arizona Diamondbacks
Jacqueline Faría, Venezuelan politician
João Faria, Portuguese footballer
José Faria (1933–2013), Brazilian footballer and manager
Manuel de Faria e Sousa (1590–1649), Portuguese historian and poet
Nelson Faria, Brazilian guitarist
Nicole Faria, Indian supermodel and actress
Nusrat Faria Mazhar, Bangladeshi film actress and model
Reginald Faria, Dutch former footballer
Reginaldo Faria, Brazilian actor and film director
Reita Faria, Miss World 1966
Rodrigo Faria, former Brazilian footballer
Rogério de Faria (Roger Faria) (1770–1848), Luso-Goan businessman
Ruben Faria, Portuguese motorcycle racer
Rui Faria, Portuguese football coach
Walter Faria, Brazilian businessman

Given name
Faria Alam, former Football Association secretary
Faria Sheikh, Pakistani actress

See also
Farias
Farías
Faria: A World of Mystery and Danger!

Portuguese-language surnames